The Pindad SPR (abbreviation from Indonesian: Senapan Penembak Runduk, Sniper Rifle) is a family of sniper rifles made by Pindad. The gun allows the shooter to adjust the height of the position and stability by regulating the bipod of the rifle located on the bottom front of the handguard.

The SPR is available in four variants. The SPR-1 and SPR-3 are chambered for the 7.62×51mm NATO cartridge, the SPR-2 is chambered for the .50 BMG cartridge and the SPR-4 is chambered for the .338 Lapua Magnum cartridge.

History
The SPR-2 was publicly shown in 2007 to visitors, including Vice President Jusuf Kalla.

The SPR-4 was unveiled by Pindad in October 2017 when the company announced it alongside the production of a new ammunition facility with a loan granted by Penyertaan Modal Negara or State Capital Participation to VIPs, including President Jokowi. It is being marketed to India in cooperation with Bhukhanvala Industries to market it for future contracts to the Indian military and law enforcement agencies.

Variants

SPR-1 

The SPR-1 is a single-shot sniper rifle chambered for the 7.62×51mm NATO cartridge. Referred to as a "Precision Tactical Rifle" by Pindad, the SPR-1 is in fact essentially a well-made version of a locally-available hunting rifle (probably based on the Remington 700), brought to military/police sniper standards. The rifle was developed from 2000 and pressed into service in 2003 due to arms embargoes as the Indonesian military was deployed in Aceh in anti-insurgency operations against GAM.https://www.airspace-review.com/2018/12/17/spr-1-senapan-runduk-pertama-buatan-pindad-yang-telah-teruji-perang/

Changes from the original rifle include the addition of a Harris-type bipod adjustable for height and cant, the addition of an adjustable cheekpiece for the standard thumbhole stock, and a rail for the mounting of various scope rings. It was also based on the Mauser SP66.

The barrel also has what Pindad refers to as a "muzzle brake," but this merely consists of a pair of angled cuts near the front of the muzzle, and is therefore just a form of porting. Feed is from an internal magazine, with a hinged floorplate for reloading and unloading the weapon. The stock is of laminated, weatherproofed wood, and the metalwork of high-grade steel with a corrosion-resistant finish.

SPR-2

The SPR-2 is a .50 BMG anti-materiel rifle which is fed from a 5-round box magazine. It has a range of 2,000 meters (2 kilometers) and it can be equipped with a suppressor. The SPR-2 can be used to penetrate steel plating for up to 2 centimeters. It was first revealed in 2007.https://www.kkip.go.id/2020/11/19/spr-2-senapan-buatan-pindad-1/>

The weapon has a foldable carry handle, which is used to carry it in case of short distance. The SPR-2 has a picatinny rail on the upper receiver to allow the easy installation of any optics with a foldable monopod on the stock.

Its design appears to be based on the Zastava M93.

SPR-3

The SPR-3 is a magazine-fed variant of the SPR-1, chambered in 7.62x51mm NATO ammo. It was developed to replace the SPR-1 in Indonesian service. The SPR-3 was introduced in 2010 after development of the rifle was done from 2007. The rifle was shown to the public in 2011 at the APSDEX convention. Its known in the Indonesian military as the "Blue Angel".

The weapon is designed with a skeleton stock that has a foldable monopod with a free-floating barrel and a large multi-slot muzzle broke. Its design was based on the SPR-2. Changes from the first prototype rifles include the buttstock, front grip and the rod attachment for the bipod.

With a suppressor installed, the SPR-3 can be fired from up to 500 meters if subsonic ammunition is used.

SPR-4

The SPR-4 is a .338 Lapua Magnum magazine-fed sniper rifle. It has an effective range of 1500 meters, which serve to fulfill firepower gaps between the SPR-1/SPR-3 and SPR-2. It has a capacity of five rounds.

It was first introduced by the company on October 2017.

Users

 : Used by Bangladesh Armed Forces.
 : Exported SPR-2s to Fiji.
 : SPR-2s/3s used by the TNI. 150 SPR-2s known to be used by Kopassus forces.

Future
 : Laos has expressed an interest to acquire SPR-2s in a potential contract in a meeting between Pindad representatives and Laotian officials on September 21, 2017.

References

External links
 Official Pindad SPR-2 page
 Official Pindad SPR-3 page

.50 BMG sniper rifles
7.62×51mm NATO rifles
Firearms articles needing expert attention
Post–Cold War military equipment of Indonesia
Bolt-action rifles
Sniper rifles of Indonesia